Stryama Peak is the ice-covered peak rising to 2193 m on the west side of Rouen Mountains in northern Alexander Island, Antarctica. It surmounts Rosselin Glacier to the north-northwest. The peak's foothills were visited on 10 January 1988 by the geological survey team of Christo Pimpirev and Borislav Kamenov (First Bulgarian Antarctic Expedition), and Philip Nell and Peter Marquis (British Antarctic Survey).

The feature is named after the settlement of Stryama in Southern Bulgaria.

Location

Maps
 British Antarctic Territory. Scale 1:200000 topographic map. DOS 610 – W 69 70. Tolworth, UK, 1971
 Antarctic Digital Database (ADD). Scale 1:250000 topographic map of Antarctica. Scientific Committee on Antarctic Research (SCAR). Since 1993, regularly upgraded and updated

Notes

References
 Bulgarian Antarctic Gazetteer. Antarctic Place-names Commission. (details in Bulgarian, basic data in English)
 Stryama Peak. SCAR Composite Gazetteer of Antarctica

External links
 Stryama Peak. Copernix satellite image

Mountains of Alexander Island
Bulgaria and the Antarctic